The men's standing long jump was one of six jumping events on the athletics at the 1908 Summer Olympics programme in London. The competition was held on Monday, July 20, 1908. Twenty-five long jumpers from eleven nations competed. NOCs could enter up to 12 athletes. The event was won by Ray Ewry of the United States, his third consecutive victory in the event. Ewry won all eight standing jump events from 1900 to 1908 as well as both events at the 1906 Intercalated Games. Konstantinos Tsiklitiras of Greece took silver. American Martin Sheridan earned bronze.

Background

This was the third appearance of the event, which was held four times from 1900 to 1912. American Ray Ewry returned as the two-time defending Olympic champion and world record holder; he was heavily favored in this as well as all the standing jumps. Also returning from the 1904 competition was fellow American and bronze medalist John Biller.

Belgium, Canada, Denmark, Finland, Germany, Great Britain, Greece, the Netherlands, and Sweden each made their debut in the event. The United States made its third appearance, the only nation to have competed in all three editions of the standing long jump to that point.

Competition format

The 1908 format introduced the two-round format. Only the top three jumpers in the qualifying round advanced to the final. Each jumper had three jumps in the qualifying round; finalists received an additional three jumps, with qualifying round jumps still counting if the final jumps were not better.

Records

These were the standing world and Olympic records (in metres) prior to the 1908 Summer Olympics.

Schedule

Results

Sources

 Official Report of the Games of the IV Olympiad (1908).
 De Wael, Herman. Herman's Full Olympians: "Athletics 1908". Accessed 7 April 2006.

Athletics at the 1908 Summer Olympics
Long jump at the Olympics